Sarvestan Rural District is a rural district (dehestan) in the Central District of Bavanat County, Fars Province, Iran. At the 2006 census, its population was 3,804, in 1,074 families.  The rural district has 15 villages.

References 

Rural Districts of Fars Province
Bavanat County